Courtney Walker Hamlin (October 27, 1858 – February 16, 1950) was a U.S. representative from Missouri and cousin of William Edward Barton.

Early life
Hamlin was born in Brevard, North Carolina. In 1869 moved to Missouri with his parents, who settled in Leasburg, Crawford County. He attended the common schools and Salem Academy, where he studied law. He was admitted to the bar in 1882 and commenced practice in Bolivar, Missouri.

Political career
Hamlin was elected as a Democrat to the Fifty-eighth Congress (March 4, 1903 – March 3, 1905). He was an unsuccessful candidate for reelection in 1904 to the Fifty-ninth Congress. Hamlin was elected to the Sixtieth and to the five succeeding Congresses (March 4, 1907 – March 3, 1919). He served as chairman of the Committee on Expenditures in the Department of State (Sixty-second through Sixty-fifth Congresses). He was an unsuccessful candidate for renomination in 1918.

Later life
He resumed the practice of law in Springfield, Missouri, until November 1935, when he retired and moved to Santa Monica, California, where he died February 16, 1950. He was interred in East Lawn Cemetery in Springfield, Missouri.

References

External links
 

1858 births
1950 deaths
Democratic Party members of the United States House of Representatives from Missouri
People from Brevard, North Carolina
People from Bolivar, Missouri
People from Springfield, Missouri